Turowo  is a village in the administrative district of Gmina Kozłowo, within Nidzica County, Warmian-Masurian Voivodeship, in northern Poland.

The village reportedly has a population of 160.

References

Turowo